David P. Tyndall (17 May 1890 — 6 January 1970) was a leading Irish businessman in the 20th century, and played the major role in helping modernize the wholesale and retail grocery trade, consolidate it, and enable the family grocery shop owner adapt to the advent of supermarkets.

Family background
The grandson of John Tyndall from Newcastle, County Dublin, a saddlery and forge owner, he was also descended from an O'Donnell of Tyrconnell, through a great-grandmother from Glenties, County Donegal. A native of Chapelizod, he left school at the age of 14 to work and in due time become a leading entrepreneur. He married Sarah Gaynor (1 January 1892 – 19 August 1978) from Inchicore in Dublin, in 1914, and had six children, William, David, Jr. ("Dave"), Annie, Mona, John, and Stephanie. They settled in Glasnevin.

William and Dave joined their father's business when they reached the age of 16. Annie died in 1934, a young woman. Mona joined the Holy Rosary Sisters and became a medical doctor and missionary in Africa. John became a leading Dublin psychiatrist. Stephanie married an Army officer, Patrick Denis O'Donnell.

Career in business
In 1931, David P. Tyndall decided to start his own business, having been a wholesale butter merchant for some years. With a partner, they founded Doherty, Tyndall & Co. Ltd., distributing groceries by horse and two-wheeled cart. By 1941, the firm had expanded to thirteen employees, including his two older sons, Willie and Davy. Transport switched from horse to motor. In 1943, the company became wholly owned as D. Tyndall & Sons, Ltd. Another company was founded and added in 1957, Farm Sales Ltd. 

In the years that followed, other companies were taken over, and the business diversified and expanded, in tandem with technological innovations, commercial initiatives, and marketing prowess. Modern business methods were developed, such as "cash and carry" wholesaling in 1964, and incentive schemes for workers were introduced. Upon his retirement he had achieved the premier position in Ireland for his influence on the wholesale and retail grocery sector, with the largest network in the country.

Private sector influence
With time, he and his sons realised the benefits of consolidation in the sector, and founded a business association of retailers, RG Data (Retail Grocery, Dairy and Allied Trades), which became a powerful business lobby, highly regarded by both manufacturers and Government. Politicians such as Taoisigh (Irish Prime Ministers) Éamon de Valera, Liam Cosgrave, and Jack Lynch supported business initiatives by David P. Tyndall and his sons.

In 1963, he introduced the Dutch-based supermarket chain, SPAR, into Ireland, enabling the traditional small family-owned grocers to join forces and adjust to the competition from major supermarket chains, whilst retaining the benefits of friendly scale, and local flavour. One of his biggest successes was to keep prices low for the consumer while expanding his business interests, and modernising retail quality.

Other interests
He held a lifelong interest in horse-racing, and at one time owned a number of racehorses. A devout Roman Catholic, he was also a generous benefactor to the Church and various charities.

Tributes
Former Taoiseach (Prime Minister), Liam Cosgrave, and many other leaders of the political, business, and community sectors attended David P. Tyndall’s funeral in 1970. He is buried in Glasnevin Cemetery.

Companies founded
Doherty, Tyndall & Co. Ltd.
D. Tyndall & Sons, Ltd.
Farm Sales, Ltd.
Creamery packers, Ltd.
Efficient Distribution, Ltd. (Golden Goose Stores)
SPAR Ireland Ltd.
Cameron Markets, Ltd.
Park Markets, Ltd.
Greenhills Produce, Ltd.
Phoenix Markets, Ltd.

References

External links
 RG Data, Retail Grocery, Dairy and Allied Trades
 SPAR Ireland

Background references
The O’Donnells of Tyrconnell – A Hidden Legacy, by Francis Martin O'Donnell, published by Academica Press LLC in London and Washington, D.C., 2018, (750 pages). 
Tyndall manuscript genealogies: see MS. vols. F.3.23, F.3.27, F.4.18 in Trinity College Library, Dublin
The Book of Dignities, by Joseph Timothy Haydn, 3rd edition, W.H. Allen & Co., London, 1894
Fairbairn's Book of Crests of Families of Great Britain and Ireland, by James Fairbairn, (2 Vols.)T.C. & E.C. Jack, London, 1905
Prerogative Wills of Ireland (1536–1810) - Index, by Sir Arthur Vicars, Dublin, 1897
A Genealogical and Heraldic History of the Commoners of Great Britain and Ireland, by John Burke, London, 1838
A Guide to Irish Country Houses by Mark Bence-Jones, Constable & Co.Ltd., London, 1988 (pp. 19, 41)
Dublin Almanacks, 1830, 1840, 1860

1890 births
1970 deaths
Burials at Glasnevin Cemetery
Businesspeople from Dublin (city)
People from Glasnevin